Orel Ice Fringe is a strip of coastal ice in Antarctica in the Antarctic Peninsula along the Danco Coast, bordering the south side of Errera Channel between Beneden Head and Porro Bluff, on the west coast of Graham Land. Mapped by the Falkland Islands Dependencies Survey (FIDS) from photos taken by Hunting Aerosurveys Ltd. in 1956–57. Named by the United Kingdom Antarctic Place-Names Committee (UK-APC) in 1960 for Eduard von Orel (1877–1941), Austrian surveyor who in 1905 designed the first stereoautograph for plotting maps directly from horizontal photographs.

References

Ice piedmonts of Graham Land
Danco Coast